Matthew "Matt" Preston, professionally known Phaeleh (pronounced "fella") is a multi-instrumentalist, producer and DJ residing in Bristol, England. He has stated that his performing name has no specific meaning.

He produces music that could be loosely described as cinematic electronica, but his roots are in dubstep, garage and house. He describes it as "electronic bass music" with a heavy emphasis on melody and emotional content. His main inspirations are Boards of Canada, Aphex Twin, LTJ Bukem, Global Communication and Brian Eno. His compositions combine live instrumentation and electronic production.

Discography

EPs
 Reflections EP (2008)
 Inside EP (2008)
 The Cold In You EP (2011)
 From the Vaults EP (2012)
All That Remains EP (2016)

Singles
 "Lounge" (2009)
 "Fire" (2009)
"Afterglow" (2010)
 "Untitled 333"/"Tachi" (2010)
 "Low" (2010)
 "Cheki" (2010)
 "Falling" (2011)
 "Storm" (2013)

Albums
 Within the Emptiness (2009)
 Fallen Light (2010)
 Tides (2013)
 A World Without (2014)
 Somnus (2014)
 Illusion of the Tale (2016)
 Lost Time (2017)
 Clarity (2018)
 Embers (2020)
 From The Vaults: Vol 2 (2020)
 Soma (2021)
 A New Day (2022)

References

External links
 

Year of birth missing (living people)
Living people
Musicians from Bristol
English record producers
Future garage musicians
UK garage musicians
Musicians from Wiltshire
People from Wiltshire
Electronic dance music DJs
DJs_from_Bristol